The military courts of Thailand are judicial bodies with criminal jurisdiction over members of the Royal Thai Armed Forces and sometimes also over civilians as may be assigned by law, as was the case from 25 May 2014 until 12 September 2016 following the 2014 Thai coup d'état.

Unlike other courts in the judicial system of Thailand, military courts are subject to the Ministry of Defence and are operated by the military's Judge Advocate General's Department.

Procedure
The current procedural law governing the military courts is the Military Court Organisation Act 1955. The act allows the Judge Advocate General of Thailand to establish court regulations. In wartime or during the imposition of martial law, military courts may adopt special procedures.

Judges
Military court judges are serving military officers of two types: "general judges" and "judge-advocates". General judges are officers for whom legal training is not a prerequisite. Judge-advocates are trained and accredited in the law.

Structure
According to the Military Court Organisation Act 1955, military courts consist of three tiers: courts of first (trial court), second (appellate court), and third instance (final court of appeal).

The act permits the establishment of special military courts, known as war crime courts, in time of war or during periods of martial law.

See also
 Judiciary of Thailand

References

External links
 Judge Advocate General's Department

Military courts
Judiciary of Thailand
Military of Thailand
Courts and tribunals with year of establishment missing